Taxiu (Mandarin: 塔秀乡) is a town in Guinan County, Hainan Tibetan Autonomous Prefecture, Qinghai, China. In 2010, Taxiu had a total population of 9,719 people: 4,886 males and 4,833 females: 2,963 under 14 years old, 6,281 aged between 15 and 64 and 475 over 65 years old.

References 

Hainan Tibetan Autonomous Prefecture